Jade Latoya Bailey (born June 10, 1983) is a track and field sprint athlete who competes internationally for Barbados.
Bailey lives in Barbados and is coached by Keith Thornhill.

She won the bronze medal in 200 metres at the 2006 Central American and Caribbean Games. Bailey has competed in several European meetings between 2007 & 2009.

Bailey represented Barbados at the 2008 Summer Olympics in Beijing. She competed at the 100 metres sprint and placed second in her first round heat after Yevgeniya Polyakova in a time of 11.24 seconds. She qualified for the second round but was eliminated not qualifying for the semi finals as her time of 11.67 was the eighth time of her race. In 2009, she represented Barbados at the IAAF World Championships in the 200m event in which she holds the national record of 22.91 seconds.

She is a member of the Fenerbahçe S.K. athletics club in Turkey.

References

External links

1983 births
Living people
Barbadian female sprinters
Barbadian javelin throwers
Female javelin throwers
Olympic athletes of Barbados
Athletes (track and field) at the 2008 Summer Olympics
Commonwealth Games competitors for Barbados
Athletes (track and field) at the 2014 Commonwealth Games
Pan American Games competitors for Barbados
Athletes (track and field) at the 2007 Pan American Games
Competitors at the 2006 Central American and Caribbean Games
Fenerbahçe athletes
Central American and Caribbean Games bronze medalists for Barbados
Central American and Caribbean Games medalists in athletics
Olympic female sprinters